Oscar de Larrazábal (born June 8, 1916, died February 3,1978) was a Filipino boxer who competed in the 1936 Summer Olympics. In 1936 he was eliminated in the quarter-finals of the bantamweight class after losing his fight to eventual silver medalist Jack Wilson.

He hailed from Bacolod City, Negros Occidental when he represented the Visayas and the Philippines in the 1936 Berlin Olympics.

He was born in Manila on June 8, 1916 to parents Jacinto Emilio German Lope de Larrazabal y Cuerva and Angela Sanchez y Lalinde. His grandparents were Roque Jacinto de Larrazabal y Rotaeche from Llodio, Alava, Spain and Maria Cuerva y Mendoza of Bulacan.

He finished high school in Bacolod City at the Negros Occidental High School, where he distinguished himself as a boxing champion. At 20 years old, he locked horns with the top amateur boxers of the country to qualify and win a spot as a bantamweight with the Philippine boxing team to the 1936 Berlin Olympics.

He won over Frederiksen (DEN) & Stasch (GER) before losing to Wilson (USA) in the quarterfinals. Jack Wilson was 6 feet tall and towered over Larrazabal who was 5'7". According to a German article in the Olympia 1936, 'Drama at the Boxing Tournament', Larrazabal was knocked down on the canvas 4 times but refused to stay down and continued to fight until the referee stopped the unequal fight.

He went on to study Law as a scholar of Far Eastern University, graduating with a Law degree in 1947 and passing the Philippine Bar Examination in 1948.

Pioneered in the travel Industry business in the late 50's helping countless people migrate to the United States.

External links
 
Oscar de Larrazábal's profile at Sports Reference.com

1916 births
Year of death missing
Sportspeople from Bacolod
Bantamweight boxers
Boxers at the 1936 Summer Olympics
Filipino male boxers
Olympic boxers of the Philippines